The Larochelle River (in French: rivière Larochelle) is a tributary of the Bécancour River. It flows in the municipalities of Saint-Julien and Irlande, in the Les Appalaches Regional County Municipality (MRC), in the administrative region of Chaudière-Appalaches, in Quebec, in Canada.

Geography 

The main neighboring watersheds of the Larochelle river are:
 north side: Bécancour River, William Lake;
 east side: Bécancour River, Lac à la Truite;
 south side: Blanche River;
 west side: Côté brook, Bulstrode River.

From its head, the Larochelle river flows over  divided into the following segments:
  towards the south-east, in the municipality of Saint-Julien, to a forest road;
  north-east, up to the road;
  north, to the west 2e rang road;
  north, up to the hamlet "Le Cent-Ans" bridge;
  north, to the hamlet bridge "Maple Grove";
  eastward, up to its confluence.

The Larochelle river empties on the west bank of the Bécancour River.

Toponymy 

The toponym "rivière Larochelle" was made official on August 17, 1978, at the Commission de toponymie du Québec.

See also 
 List of rivers of Quebec

References 

Rivers of Chaudière-Appalaches
Les Appalaches Regional County Municipality